Phthinia is a genus of flies belonging to the family Mycetophilidae.

The genus has almost cosmopolitan distribution.

Species:
 Phthinia amorimi Fitzgerald 
 Phthinia amurensis Zaitzev, 1994

References

Mycetophilidae